Tajanjar-e Sofla (also Romanized as Tajanjār-e Soflá; also known as Tajanjār-e Pā’īn) is a village in Pain Khiyaban-e Litkuh Rural District, in the Central District of Amol County, Mazandaran Province, Iran. At the 2006 census, its population was 639, in 162 families.

References 

Populated places in Amol County